Waipapa River is the name of three rivers in New Zealand's North Island.
 Waipapa River (Northland)
 Waipapa River (Bay of Plenty)
 Waipapa River (Waikato)

References